Žalgiris Arena is a multi-purpose indoor arena in the New Town of Kaunas, Lithuania. The arena is located on an island of the Nemunas River and is the largest indoor arena in the Baltics. The arena's maximum possible seating capacity for basketball games is 15,450, and 20,000 spectators for concerts (when the stage is in the middle, and 17,000 when stage is in the side of the arena). The Žalgiris Arena replaced the Kaunas Sports Hall as a major venue in the city.

The Žalgiris Arena is used to host basketball games as well as concerts. The arena's namesake basketball club BC Žalgiris, which currently competes in the domestic LKL and the EuroLeague, uses the facility for all of its European and LKL home fixtures. BC Žalgiris and Žalgiris Arena has had the highest average attendance in the Euroleague in 2011-12, 2012-13, 2017-18, 2018-19, 2019-20, 2020-21.

History
The arena's construction started in September 2008; the main contractor of the arena is the Lithuanian construction company Vėtrūna, chief architect – Eugenijus Miliūnas. The total cost of the arena is estimated to be 168.8 M litas (50 million euros). The arena was opened on 18 August 2011 with a basketball match between Lithuania and Spain.

The Žalgiris Arena held the playoffs and finals of the 37th European Basketball Championship (EuroBasket 2011), which took place in September 2011.

On 5 December 2015, the Lithuanian group SEL set a new attendance record in the arena - 20,517 spectators with 360 stage concert.

On 6 January 2016, EuroLeague clubs general managers voted Žalgiris Arena as the tournament's best arena.

The venue hosted some matches of the 2021 FIFA Futsal World Cup, including the opening and final matches.

The pool of the Zalgirio arena arena opened its doors in September 2022. It is like a continuation of the "Žalgiris" arena, an example of industrial architecture, so for the citizens who are used to the emotions of the "Žalgiris" arena, it will undoubtedly be a normal environment.

Here you can try 11 different saunas, enjoy massage baths (jacuzzi), relaxation rooms, your little ones can have fun in the space dedicated to them, and swimming enthusiasts can exercise in the 50-meter Olympic pool.

The spa area is equipped with two leisure pools with spacious relaxation baths. You will be able to enjoy massage baths while sitting, standing or lying down - in special underwater loungers. In standing relaxation baths, you can adjust the intensity of the program and relax tense muscles after sports in the Olympic pool. Specially equipped places for palm and foot massage - this way you can activate and stimulate the biologically active points here. In the outdoor massage bath, you will enjoy the view of the nature of Nemunas Island both in summer and in winter.

A 50-meter Olympic pool with 10 lanes is installed in the pool of the "Žalgiris" arena. Adjacent is an additional 25-meter pool with two 90-cm-deep lanes for teaching children to swim.
The pool, equipment and facilities are adapted to meet the requirements of the International Swimming Federation FINA. So official international level competitions can take place here.
Tribunes for spectators have been installed near the Olympic swimming pool, where 500 spectators will be able to watch the competition.

Arena information

It holds 20,000 spectators for concerts. It is situated in the eastern part of the Nemunas river island and its shape has nine corners. The arena's facade is made of high-end and highly transparent glass. A part of the facade has a unique metal wall, which is already naturally encrusted with rust.

It is equipped with some unique technical solutions, such as power windows and modern ice-making installation. Advanced audio equipment (amplifiers, digital mixing engines and stage boxes) by Yamaha is installed in the Žalgiris Arena. The arena has 48 VIP suites, 21 suites for the Žalgiris basketball club and media, 9 suites for a single rent, an exhibition hall, and a fitness center. There are 8 halls in the arena, where more than 150 various events take place annually.

Major events
Since its opening in 2011, Žalgiris Arena hosted many concerts. The main stars, who held concerts in Kaunas were: Red Hot Chili Peppers, Lenny Kravitz, Sting, Eric Clapton, Elton John, Rammstein, Slash, Marilyn Manson, Katie Melua, Prodigy, James Blunt, Hurts, Jean Michel Jarre, Zucchero, Sarah Brightman, Kylie Minogue, Robbie Williams, Iron Maiden, Mariah Carey, Muse, and Dua Lipa. On May 5, 2017, Canadian pop star Nelly Furtado re-announced that she will be performing at the venue on October 24, 2017, instead of performing on October 13, 2017,. On April 18, 2017, Queen played at the venue on November 17, 2017, as a part of the Queen + Adam Lambert Tour. On 11 March 2018, it hosted the final of the Eurovizija 2018.

Motocross World Championship event Night of the Jumps also took place in Žalgiris Arena on March, 2013. This event was part of Night of the Jumps world tour.

The arena hosted the 2021 FIFA Futsal World Cup group, play-offs and final matches.

EuroLeague attendance
This is a list of EuroLeague games attendance of Žalgiris at Žalgiris Arena.

See also
 List of indoor arenas in Lithuania

References

External links

Construction progress

Indoor arenas in Lithuania
Basketball venues in Lithuania
Basketball in Kaunas
Landmarks in Kaunas
Sport in Kaunas
Buildings and structures in Kaunas
2021 FIFA Futsal World Cup venues
2011 establishments in Lithuania
Sports venues completed in 2011